Vít Jedlička (born 6 September 1983) is a Czech libertarian politician, publicist and activist.

He was the chairman of the Party of Free Citizens in the Hradec Králové Region and currently serves as the founder and chairman of the Czech voluntary association Reformy.cz. On 13 April 2015, he founded the self-declared libertarian micronation Free Republic of Liberland and became its first president.

Education 
In 2008, Jedlička received a bachelor’s degree in international relations and affairs from the University of Economics, Prague. He gained his master’s degree in political science at the CEVRO Institute in 2014.

Background 
Jedlička's father was removed from his office job at the Institute of Weights and Measures in Prague after losing favour with the authorities for resisting the Communist Party membership and was sent to work as a mechanic. During the 1997 Czech financial crisis, his family nearly went bankrupt when the Czech central bank raised interest rates to 25 percent. Jedlička's working career ranges from sales and management to financial analysis and IT. From 2006 to 2009, he was the managing director of HKfree.net, a civic network and internet service in his hometown of Hradec Králové. From 2009 to 2014, Jedlička was the regional chairman of the Party of Free Citizens. In 2011, he co-founded Reformy.cz, a community news service of libertarian roots, and became its chairman.

Politics 
From 2001, Vít Jedlička was a member of Civic Democratic Party. Since 2009 he has been a member of the Free Citizens Party. In 2009 he was elected the first regional president in Hradec Králové Region of the Free Citizens Party. 

As an independent, Jedlička was the leading candidate of the coalition of the Free Citizens Party, Liberland, and Radostné Česko - ODEJDEME BEZ PLACENÍ for the 2019 European Parliament election in the Czech Republic.

Views 
Jedlička considers himself as libertarian with liberal views on individual freedom and the least state intrusion possible. A Property and Freedom Society attendee in 2015, his views are similar to that of American politician Ron Paul. He has described himself as a Bastiat-influenced anarcho-capitalist in a podcast. Jedlička is a Eurosceptic who alleges there is a democratic deficit in the institution of the EU and abuses of basic moral rules by EU institutions and EU member states. Jedlička described the European Stability Mechanism as a protectorate. He opposes socialism.

Liberland 

On 13 April 2015, Vít Jedlička proclaimed the Free Republic of Liberland on what he considered an unclaimed land lot (terra nullius) known as Siga between Serbia and Croatia. The Preparatory Committee which Jedlička appointed elected him as president that same day.

References

External links 

 Personal blog on iDNES.cz 
 Website of the Free Republic of Liberland

1983 births
Living people
Civic Democratic Party (Czech Republic) politicians
21st-century Czech economists
Czech libertarians
Micronational leaders
Politicians from Hradec Králové
Svobodní politicians
Prague University of Economics and Business alumni